Doraops zuloagai is the only species in the genus Doraops of the catfish (order Siluriformes) family Doradidae. This species originates from and Lake Maracaibo basin as well as the Apón River, Santa Ana River, Catatumbo River, Escalante River and Rio de Los Pajaros basins of Colombia and Venezuela. These fish prefer muddy backwaters and feed on insects, worms, small crabs, and snails. They reach a length of  SL and are a component of local commercial fisheries.

References

Doradidae
Monotypic fish genera
Catfish of South America
Freshwater fish of Colombia
Fish of Venezuela
Fish described in 1944
Taxa named by Leonard Peter Schultz